Juan Vicente Ribera was a Spanish painter, practicing at Madrid in the early part of the 18th century. He was one of the artists appointed by the Council of Castile in 1725 to tax pictures. He painted the pendentives of the cupola in the church of San Felipe el Real, and painted two scenes from the Life of S. Francis de Paul in the church of la Victoria, and a Martyrdom of S. Justus.

References

Spanish Baroque painters
18th-century Spanish painters
18th-century Spanish male artists
Spanish male painters